Maharaja Surajmal Institute of Technology is a private engineering college located in Janakpuri, Delhi. The college is affiliated to Guru Gobind Singh Indraprastha University.

Administration
Maharaja Surajmal Institute is a self-financing private institute. The governing body of the institutes (MSI, MSIP and MSIT) is Surajmal Memorial Educational Society (SMES).

Recognition
The Institute is affiliated with G.G.S.I.P. University, New Delhi. ECE, CSE, IT and EEE Department have NBA Accreditation.

See also
 Maharaja Suraj Mal

References

Education in Delhi
Universities and colleges in Delhi
Colleges of the Guru Gobind Singh Indraprastha University